The Deadman Islands are an island group located inside western Coronation Gulf, south of Victoria Island, in the Kitikmeot Region, Nunavut, Canada. Other island groups in the vicinity include the Berens Islands, Black Berry Islands, Couper Islands, Lawford Islands, Leo Islands, and Sir Graham Moore Islands.

References

External links
 Deadman Islands at the Atlas of Canada

Islands of Coronation Gulf
Uninhabited islands of Kitikmeot Region